Case Study 01 (stylized in all caps) is the second studio album by Canadian singer and songwriter Daniel Caesar, released on June 28, 2019, through Golden Child Recordings. It features guest appearances from Brandy, Pharrell Williams, John Mayer, Sean Leon and Jacob Collier.

Promotion
Caesar held a listening party in Los Angeles in the week leading up to the album's release. Along with invited music industry figures, the event was also open to the first 200 guests that arrived. Caesar also teased the album on social media, including with a video of a person walking across a desert set to a "muted keyboard melody" and a quote from scientist J. Robert Oppenheimer.

Critical reception

Jacob Carey of Exclaim! noted the "experimental nature" of the album, concluding: "Although Case Study 01 may not receive the same critical reception as Freudian, it's a solid effort by an artist who is, more or less, still a rookie, attempting to diversify his sound early on in order to avoid cementing himself into gospel music for the entirety of his career." Aaron Williams of Uproxx stated: "Even with Caesar's newfound physicality, Case Study 01 is still a thoughtful, beautiful-sounding album. If nothing else, it proves he's still a smart, intriguing songwriter who could wring twice as much romance out of a couplet as any of his contemporaries. But there's also a sense that maybe he's trying a little too hard here as well."

The album was longlisted for the 2020 Polaris Music Prize.

Track listing

Notes
 All track titles are stylized in all caps
  signifies an additional producer
 "Cyanide" contains additional vocals by River Tiber and Kardinal Offishall
 "Entropy" and "Frontal Lobe Muzik" contains additional vocals by Sean Leon
 "Too Deep to Turn Back" contains additional vocals by Arainna Reid
 "Complexities" contains additional vocals by Liza Yohannes

Sample credits
 "Cyanide" contains samples from "Candy Maker", performed by Tommy James and the Shondells.
 "Entropy" and "Too Deep to Turn Back" contains a sample from "At the River" as performed by Groove Armada, written by Andrew Cocup and Tom Findlay.

Personnel
Credits adapted from Daniel Caesar's Instagram.

Musicians
 Daniel Caesar – production ; recording, programming 
 Alex Ernewein – production 
 Arianna Reid – additional vocals 
 Boi-1da – production 
 DJ Camper – additional keys 
 Ethan Ashby – additional production 
 John Mayer – production, additional vocals ; electric guitar 
 Jordan Evans – production ; additional production, drums 
 Kardinal Offishall – additional vocals 
 Liam Mitro – saxophone, flute 
 Liza Yohannes – additional vocals 
 Matthew Burnett – production ; electric bass 
 River Tiber – additional vocals , additional production , recording , strings ; additional music 
 Sean Leon – additional vocals 
 The Neptunes – production 

Technical
 Alex Ernewein – recording 
 Ben "Bengineer" Sedano – assistant recording 
 Chad Franscoviak – recording 
 Gabriel Placentia – assistant recording 
 Jordan Evans – recording , additional drum programming , programming 
 Matthew Burnett – programming 
 Mikalai Skrobat – 
 Mike Larson – recording 
 Morning Estrada – recording 
 Paul Boutin – recording 
 Riley Bell – mixing, mastering ; recording 
 Rob Bisel – recording

Charts

References

2019 albums
Daniel Caesar albums
Albums recorded at Shangri-La (recording studio)